Romansa may refer to:

Romansa (1947 film), a Filipino film starring Mila del Sol
Romansa (1970 film), an Indonesian film starring Chitra Dewi
Romansa, a 1979 Filipino film starring Vilma Santos
Romansa (Cindy Bernadette album), 2012
"Romansa", song by Nedeljko Bajić Baja from the album Zapisano je u vremenu

See also
Romanza (disambiguation)
Romance (disambiguation)